Charles Johnston may refer to:

Politics
 Charles Johnston (representative) (1793–1845), U.S. Representative from New York
 Charles Clement Johnston (1795–1832), U.S. Representative from Virginia
 Charles Johnston (New Zealand politician) (1845–1918), Mayor of Wellington, New Zealand 
 Sir Charles Johnston, 1st Baronet (1848–1933), Lord Mayor of London between 1914 and 1915
 Charles Edward Johnston (1899–1971), Canadian federal politician
 Charles Johnston (diplomat) (1912–1986), British diplomat and author who translated Pushkin's Eugene Onegin
 Charles Johnston, Baron Johnston of Rockport (1915–2002), British politician
 Charles Hampton Johnston (1919–1981), Scottish Sheriff and Liberal Party politician

Other
 Charles E. Johnston (1881–1951), former president of Kansas City Southern Railway
 Charles H. Johnston, U.S. admiral, retired 2005 
 Charles Johnston (captive of Native Americans) (1770–1833), American lawyer who wrote a captivity narrative
 Charles Johnston (travel writer) (1812–1872), wrote about Abyssinia and founded the Durban Botanic Gardens
 Charles Johnston (priest) (1842–1925), Archdeacon of Bombay
 Charles Johnston (Theosophist) (1867–1931), author, translator and theosophist, served in the British Bengal Service
 Charles Johnston (umpire) (1896–1988), Major League Baseball umpire
 Charlie Johnston (1875–1950), Australian Rules footballer
 Charlie Johnston (footballer) (1911–1991), Scottish footballer

See also
 Charles Johnstone (disambiguation)
 Charles Johnson (disambiguation)